The Darlington & Stockton Times is a British, regional, weekly, paid for, newspaper covering the Richmond - Darlington - Stokesley - Thirsk - Leyburn area. It is published in Darlington by Newsquest Media Group Ltd, a subsidiary of Gannett Company Inc. Three separate editions are published for County Durham, North Yorkshire and Cleveland.

A substantial proportion of Darlington & Stockton Times readers live in rural areas, and it contains information and news relating to farming issues.

It was one of the last UK newspapers to devote its front page entirely to adverts; a practice that persisted until 1997. 
Compact format replaced broadsheet in 2009.

History

Title
The Darlington & Stockton Times was first published with four broadsheet pages, on a single sheet, in 1847 as the:

That was soon changed to:

before in 1894, the full title became:

Objectives

Before publication, Brown advertised the newspaper would

In the event, page one of the first edition contained only auction news, insurance and general advertisements. Meetings of the Darlington Abstinence Society and Stockton Institute of Literature and Science filled page two, but it sold out.

Ownership

Location

Circulation

Weekly ABC circulation for second half of year:

ISSN

The Darlington & Stockton Times regional edition ISSN codes are:

1470-4305, North Yorkshire
1470-4307, County Durham
1470-4323, Cleveland

References

External links
Official Website

Newspapers published by Newsquest
Newspapers published in County Durham
Newspapers established in 1847
Borough of Darlington
1847 establishments in England
Weekly newspapers published in the United Kingdom